Sebastian Fabian Klonowic (1545 Sulmierzyce – 29 August 1602 Lublin) was a Polish poet, composer and mayor of Lublin.

Biography
He studied at the University of Kraków.  He was also known by his Latin name, Acernus, and wrote in both Polish and Latin. He first lived in Lwów, then he settled in Lublin. While in Lublin, he became mayor.

He wrote attacks in Latin on the Jesuits. His Latin poems were filled with Latinized Polish words, and on the other hand his Polish poems were often made unintelligible by the use of Latinisms and Hellenisms literally translated. He lived his last years on the charity of the Jesuits.

Famous works
Roxolania (1584) — a description the people and land of Ruthenia
Flis, to Jest Spuszczanie Statków Wisłą (1595) — an early example of the Sapphic stanza in Polish poetry, exceptional for its length
Worek Judaszów  (1600)
Victoria Deorum (1587)
Żale nagrobne na ślachetnie urodzonego Pana Jana Kochanowskiego
Gorais
Hebdomas, to jest Siedem tegodniowych piosnek wyjętych z pierwszych Ksiąg Moiżeszowych kapituły pierwszej, co którego dnia Pan Bóg stworzył i jako siódmego dnia odpoczynął, krótko zebranych przez Sebastyjana Klonowica z Sulimierzyc, pisarza ławicy lubelskiej (1581) — songs

Notes

References
 Biography

External links 
 Klonowic's works on Polish Wikisource
 Digital versions of his works
 
 Works by Sebastian Klonowic in digital library Polona

1545 births
1602 deaths
16th-century Latin-language writers
Polish poets
Polish satirists
New Latin-language poets
Polish composers
Jagiellonian University alumni
Polish male poets